Hugo Ranulfo Sosa  (born 26 November 1970 in Luque) is a Paraguayan football manager and former player who played as a forward. He is the current manager of Bolivian side Guabirá's youth categories.

Club career
Sosa began his professional career in Paraguay, and had a spell with Sportivo Luqueño. He had a brief loan spell with Emelec in Serie A de Ecuador during 1993. Sosa finished his career playing in Bolivia with Club San José, The Strongest and Unión Central.

International career
Sosa made two appearances for the senior Paraguay national football team during 1999. He also played for Paraguay at the 1992 Summer Olympics in Barcelona. Sosa made his international debut for Paraguay on 21 April 1996 in a friendly match against Bosnia (3-0 win) in Asunción.

References

External links

1970 births
Living people
Paraguayan footballers
Paraguay international footballers
Footballers at the 1992 Summer Olympics
Olympic footballers of Paraguay
Sportivo Luqueño players
C.S. Emelec footballers
Club San José players
The Strongest players
Expatriate footballers in Bolivia
Expatriate footballers in Ecuador
Sportspeople from Luque
Unión Tarija players
Association football forwards
Paraguayan football managers
Paraguayan expatriate football managers
Paraguayan expatriate sportspeople in Bolivia
Expatriate football managers in Bolivia
Club Deportivo Guabirá managers